Mascia is an Italian surname. Notable people with the surname include:

Graziella Mascia (1953–2018), Italian politician
Jennifer Mascia (born 1977), American writer
Juan Cruz Mascia (born 1994), Uruguayan footballer
Nello Mascia (born 1946), Italian actor

See also 
 Masha (disambiguation)

Italian-language surnames